Ireland participated in the Eurovision Song Contest 2008 with the song "Irelande Douze Pointe" written by Darren Smith, Simon Fine and Dustin the Turkey. The song was performed by children's show puppet Dustin the Turkey. The Irish broadcaster Raidió Teilifís Éireann (RTÉ) organised the national final Eurosong 2008 in order to select the Irish entry for the 2008 contest in Belgrade, Serbia. Six songs faced a public televote, ultimately resulting in the selection of "Irelande Douze Pointe" performed by Dustin the Turkey as the Irish Eurovision entry.

Ireland was drawn to compete in the first semi-final of the Eurovision Song Contest which took place on 20 May 2008. Performing during the show in position 11, "Irelande Douze Pointe" was not announced among the top 10 entries of the first semi-final and therefore did not qualify to compete in the final. It was later revealed that Ireland placed fifteenth out of the 19 participating countries in the semi-final with 22 points.

Background

Prior to the 2008 Contest, Ireland had participated in the Eurovision Song Contest forty-one times since its first entry in 1965. Ireland has won the contest a record seven times in total. The country's first win came in 1970, with then-18-year-old Dana winning with "All Kinds of Everything". Ireland holds the record for being the only country to win the contest three times in a row (in 1992, 1993 and 1994), as well as having the only three-time winner (Johnny Logan, who won in 1980 as a singer, 1987 as a singer-songwriter, and again in 1992 as a songwriter). The Irish entry in 2007, "They Can't Stop the Spring" performed by Dervish, placed last in the final.

The Irish national broadcaster, Raidió Teilifís Éireann (RTÉ), broadcasts the event within Ireland and organises the selection process for the nation's entry. After placing last in 2007, Tara O'Brien, RTÉ spokesperson, stated: "We will definitely be having a sit-down and looking at our geographical position and going through the whole process. Without doubt that's going to happen, it was a long night." RTÉ confirmed their intentions to participate at the 2008 Eurovision Song Contest on 3 October 2007. The broadcaster had internally selected the artist in 2006 and 2007, while the song was chosen in a televised competition. For the 2008 Eurovision Song Contest, RTÉ announced alongside their confirmation that Eurosong 2008 would be organised as an open selection to choose both the artist and song to represent Ireland, after a strategic review by a five-member consultative committee appointed by the broadcaster.

Before Eurovision

Eurosong 2008 

Eurosong 2008 was the national final format developed by RTÉ in order to select Ireland's entry for the Eurovision Song Contest 2008. The competition was held on 23 February 2008 at the University Concert Hall in Limerick, hosted by Ray D'Arcy and broadcast on RTÉ One as well as online via the broadcaster's official website rte.ie. The first part of the national final was watched by 499,000 viewers in Ireland with a market share of 36%, while the second part was watched by 820,000 viewers in Ireland with a market share of 53%.

Competing entries 
On 4 November 2007, RTÉ opened a submission period where artists and composers were able to submit their entries for the competition until 23 January 2008. Artists were also required to indicate the performance and staging details of their song. At the closing of the deadline, 150 entries were received. The competing entries were selected through two phases involving two separate five-member jury panels appointed by RTÉ; the first phase involved the first jury reviewing all of the submissions and selecting a shortlist of entries, while the second phase involved the second jury selecting the six finalists. Entries in both phases were evaluated based on four criteria: suitability of the song for Eurovision, quality of the artist, experience of the artist and stage appeal of the entry. The members of the jury that selected the six finalists were producer Bill Hughes, singer-songwriter Eleanor McEvoy, singer-songwriter and former contest winner Charlie McGettigan, agent and choreographer Julian Benson and RTÉ Assistant Commissioning Entertainment Editor Julian Vignoles. The finalists were announced on 3 February 2008 with their songs presented on 21 February 2008 during The Derek Mooney Show broadcast on RTÉ Radio 1.

Final 
The final took place on 23 February 2008 and featured commentary from a panel that consisted of music manager Louis Walsh and former contest winners Dana Rosemary Scallon and Marija Šerifović. The guest performer was Šerifović performing "Molitva". Following a public televote, "Irelande Douze Pointe" performed by Dustin the Turkey was selected as the winner.

Controversy 
The announcement of Dustin the Turkey as the winner of Eurosong 2008 caused mixed reactions from the hall audience, including audible boos and panellist Dana Rosemary Scallon describing the win as a "mockery of the competition". Dana also stated that Ireland would be better withdrawing from the competition than sending Dustin. Former contest winning composers Frank McNamara and Shay Healy questioned the legitimacy of the jury panel that selected the six finalists for the competition, with the former stating that RTÉ was "giving two fingers to Irish songwriters". Selection jury chairman Bill Hughes later defended the decision of including Dustin as a finalist, citing his song, which included a "strong female vocal", was "very funny" and "had a great melody".

The controversial nature of his entry "Irelande Douze Pointe" was also said to have been in breach of the contest rules that could "bring the Shows or the ESC as such into disrepute". The song was ultimately not disqualified, however the lyrics were edited by EBU demand after the Greek broadcaster ERT complained over the use of "Macedonia" in the lyrics in light of the Macedonia naming dispute. Dustin's participation and win at Eurosong 2008 also garnered international media exposure; he was mentioned in Spanish media and appeared in the United Kingdom on the ITV morning programme This Morning during the Saint Patrick's Day celebrations. "Irelande Douze Pointe" was later released as a CD single and went on to chart at number five in the Irish Singles Chart.

At Eurovision
It was announced in September 2007 that the competition's format would be expanded to two semi-finals in 2008. According to the rules, all nations with the exceptions of the host country and the "Big Four" (France, Germany, Spain and the United Kingdom) are required to qualify from one of two semi-finals in order to compete for the final; the top nine songs from each semi-final as determined by televoting progress to the final, and a tenth was determined by back-up juries. The European Broadcasting Union (EBU) split up the competing countries into six different pots based on voting patterns from previous contests, with countries with favourable voting histories put into the same pot. On 28 January 2008, a special allocation draw was held which placed each country into one of the two semi-finals. Ireland was placed into the first semi-final, to be held on 20 May 2008. The running order for the semi-finals was decided through another draw on 17 March 2008 and Ireland was set to perform in position 11, following the entry from Poland and before the entry from Andorra.

In Ireland, the two semi-finals were broadcast on RTÉ Two and the final was broadcast on RTÉ One with all three shows featuring commentary by Marty Whelan. The three shows were also broadcast via radio on RTÉ Radio 1 with commentary by Larry Gogan. The Irish spokesperson, who announced the Irish votes during the final, was former contest winner Niamh Kavanagh.

Semi-final
Dustin the Turkey took part in technical rehearsals on 12 and 15 May, followed by dress rehearsals on 19 and 20 May. The Irish performance featured Dustin the Turkey in a green, white and gold trolley which included a record deck with a display underneath and dressed in a silver suit, performing together with three male and two female backing dancers, the latter which also performed backing vocals: Kitty B and Ann Harrington. The dancers were dressed in black cloaks at the beginning, which were removed to reveal large green, white and gold wings on two of the male dancers, a gold jumpsuit on the remaining male dancer, and gold dresses, green gloves and green headdresses on the female dancers. The LED screens displayed rippling effects of black and white as well as waves of orange, white and green.

At the end of the show, Ireland was not announced among the top 10 entries in the first semi-final and therefore failed to qualify to compete in the final. It was later revealed that Ireland placed fifteenth in the semi-final, receiving a total of 22 points.

Voting 
Below is a breakdown of points awarded to Ireland and awarded by Ireland in the first semi-final and grand final of the contest. The nation awarded its 12 points to Poland in the semi-final and to Latvia in the final of the contest.

Points awarded to Ireland

Points awarded by Ireland

After Eurovision
After his Eurovision experience, Dustin returned to Ireland where he launched a campaign against the Lisbon Treaty in the European Union, calling for a 'No' vote by the Irish on the referendum for the amendment of the Irish constitution to allow the adoption of the treaty. Dustin's campaign included the slogan "They didn't vote for us. Get them back. Vote 'No' to Lisbon", referring to his failure at Eurovision.

References

2008
Countries in the Eurovision Song Contest 2008
Eurovision
Eurovision